Fred C. Yager Stadium is a football stadium in Oxford, Ohio, United States. It is home to the Miami University RedHawks football team. It has a capacity of 24,286 spectators, and was built in 1983. It replaced Miami Field, which had been used since 1895 (the stands had been built in 1916) and was the home field for many of the coaches who had made the school famous. The stadium is named for Fred C. Yager, class of 1914, who was the lead benefactor in the project to build the stadium.

Design
The stadium has an unbalanced layout, with the west grandstands being 20 rows taller than the east (student) grandstands. A small set of bleachers sit in the north end zone; there are no seats in the south end zone under the main scoreboard. A Cradle of Coaches room is located inside the stadium, along with football offices, player meeting rooms, and locker rooms.

Renovations
Due to the successes of Miami's football program, the University has undertaken a continued series of facility upgrades beginning in 2003 with the addition of a FieldTurf playing surface. Other recent substantial upgrades of the facility include broadcast-quality permanent lighting, a new scoreboard with three Daktronics videoboards and the new Cradle of Coaches plaza in 2004, and new student bleacher sections on the east sideline and the north end zone in 2005.

Currently there is a new indoor practice facility in the north end zone, along with a current project of a new building that will include new football offices, weight room, and locker room being built in the north end zone as well.

See also
 List of NCAA Division I FBS football stadiums

References

External links

 Fred C. Yager Stadium
 Miami University Physical Facilities Project Summary

College football venues
High school football venues in Ohio
Miami RedHawks football venues
American football venues in Ohio
Buildings and structures of Miami University
1983 establishments in Ohio